Bernard Ackah (born April 9, 1972) is a Japanese-based Ivorian taekwondo practitioner, kickboxer, mixed martial artist and comedian.

Biography

Martial arts career and background
Ackah was born in Bonn, Germany to Ivorian parents and moved to Japan at the age of 2. He practiced judo during his middle school and high school days. In 1998, he went to South Korea and stayed there for 3 years to practice taekwondo at the prestigious Yonsei University.

He made his professional mixed martial arts debut in March 2007 with a first-round knockout victory over Hyun Pyo Shin at K-1 Hero's 8. He entered the spotlight later that year at Dynamite!! USA when he also knocked out former NFL player-turned-mixed martial artist Johnnie Morton. He then went on to lose his next three fights, however, including one to Dutch kickboxer Melvin Manhoef. He ended this losing streak seven seconds into his fight with Ryūshi Yanagisawa at Deep: 43rd Impact with a KO victory. He has since won two fights, both in the Deep promotion.

He entered kickboxing in December 2007 when he faced Japanese legend Musashi at K-1 PREMIUM 2007 Dynamite!!. He lost the fight via knockout in the third round. He also fought at K-1 World Grand Prix 2008 in Fukuoka and took on Tsuyoshi Nakasako, who defeated him via decision. His kickboxing record stands at two wins and three losses.

Television career
In 2001, he formed the comedy duo "Sio-Koshō"(Solt Pepper) with Rex Jones, which was active until 2008.

He is known to anime fans as the voice of the Master of Ceremonies in the original Japanese version of Yu-Gi-Oh! 5D's. He also made an appearance on the 19th Sasuke competition and failed the "Jumping Spider" in the First Stage. He recently made in appearance in Kamen Rider series, starting Kamen Rider Wizard as the Phantom Caitsith and Kamen Rider Drive as the Gunman Roidmude.

Professional wrestling career
On November 30, 2014, Ackah made his professional wrestling debut for the Dramatic Dream Team (DDT) promotion, where he was introduced as Ironman Heavymetalweight Champion LiLiCo's bodyguard. He wrestled his first match on December 13, defeating Kazuki Hirata.

Personal life
He can speak English, French, German, Korean, and Japanese.

He is married to a Japanese woman, living in his wife's parents' house, and has 3 children.

Mixed martial arts record

|-
| Loss
| align=center| 5–6
| Yuki Niimura
| Submission (rear-naked choke)
| Deep: 57 Impact
| 
| align=center| 1
| align=center| 3:35
| Tokyo, Japan
| 
|-
| Loss
| align=center| 5–5
| Shunsuke Inoue
| TKO (punches)
| Deep: Cage Impact 2011 in Tokyo, 2nd Round
| 
| align=center| 1
| align=center| 2:30
| Tokyo, Japan
| 
|-
| Loss
| align=center| 5–4
| Yoshiyuki Nakanishi
| KO (head kick)
| Deep: 54 Impact
| 
| align=center| 1
| align=center| 1:07
| Tokyo, Japan
| 
|-
| Win
| align=center| 5–3
| Minoru Kato
| Decision (unanimous)
| Deep: 47 Impact
| 
| align=center| 2
| align=center| 5:00
| Tokyo, Japan
| 
|-
| Win
| align=center| 4–3
| Shunji Kosaka
| TKO (punches)
| Deep: Cage Impact 2009
| 
| align=center| 1
| align=center| 0:34
| Tokyo, Japan
| 
|-
| Win
| align=center| 3–3
| Ryushi Yanagisawa
| TKO (head kick and punches)
| Deep: 43 Impact
| 
| align=center| 1
| align=center| 0:07
| Tokyo, Japan
| 
|-
| Loss
| align=center| 2–3
| Young Choi
| Decision (unanimous)
| Deep: 42 Impact
| 
| align=center| 2
| align=center| 5:00
| Tokyo, Japan
| 
|-
| Loss
| align=center| 2–2
| Po'ai Suganuma
| Submission (armbar)
| Hero's 2007 in Korea
| 
| align=center| 1
| align=center| 3:05
| Seoul, South Korea
| 
|-
| Loss
| align=center| 2–1
| Melvin Manhoef
| KO (punches)
| Hero's 9
| 
| align=center| 1
| align=center| 2:13
| Yokohama, Japan
| 
|-
| Win
| align=center| 2–0
| Johnnie Morton
| KO (punch)
| Dynamite!! USA
| 
| align=center| 1
| align=center| 0:38
| Los Angeles, California, United States 
| 
|-
| Win
| align=center| 1–0
| Hyun Pyo Shin
| TKO (punches)
| Hero's 8
| 
| align=center| 1
| align=center| 1:11
| Nagoya, Japan
|

Kickboxing

References

External links
 Bernard Ackah Rakuten blog
 Bernard Ackah Ameba blog
 Bernard Ackah official MySpace
 HERO'S
 K-1
 

Ivorian male kickboxers
Heavyweight kickboxers
Ivorian male mixed martial artists
Light heavyweight mixed martial artists
Mixed martial artists utilizing taekwondo
Mixed martial artists utilizing judo
Ivorian male judoka
Ivorian male taekwondo practitioners
Ivorian expatriate sportspeople in Japan
Ivorian expatriate sportspeople in South Korea
Sasuke (TV series) contestants
Living people
1972 births